One Wish is the second album by Canadian singer-songwriter Deborah Cox. It was released by Arista Records on September 15, 1998, in the United States. As with her self-titled debut album, One Wish was once again executive-produced by Clive Davis, but features more uptempo, contemporary R&B, and a slew of new producers and personnel, including Montell Jordan, Anthony "Shep" Crawford, Rodney "Darkchild" Jerkins, DJ Quik, Stevie J and David Foster. It also contains dance and club music. Diane Warren, Daryl Simmons and Lascelles Stephens also returned with contributions to the album.

The album was far more successful than its predecessor, earning a platinum certification from the Recording Industry Association of America (RIAA), while going gold in Canada. Cox was nominated for three Juno Awards for the album, winning two, including Best R&B Soul Recording for "Things Just Ain't the Same" in 1998 and Best R&B Soul Recording for One Wish in 1999. "Nobody's Supposed to Be Here" also won a Soul Train Music Awards for Best Female R&B/Soul Single, and a Soul Train Lady of Soul Award for Best R&B/Soul Song of the Year.

The success of the album was in part due to the crossover success of the lead single "Nobody's Supposed to Be Here" which became Cox's most successful entry on the Billboard Hot 100, peaking at number two, and remaining there for eight consecutive weeks, making it one of the longest stays at number two in chart history. The song also reached number one on the Hot R&B/Hip-Hop Songs, spending a then record-breaking 14 weeks at number one. "We Can't Be Friends" was the second-most successful single from the album, reaching the top ten, while "It's Over Now" and "I Never Knew" both reached the top on the Billboard Hot Dance Club Songs.

Critical reception

AllMusic editor Jose F. Promis described the album's musical spectrum as "varied, ranging from the typical cheating man song popular at the time, to safe middle-of-the-road, adult contemporary fare, and club anthems [...] Cox's voice, a powerhouse unto itself, sounds just as effective and very sweet when she's not belting out a tune Whitney Houston-style [...] A good album, which includes a couple of quintessential 1990s dance hits, and a prime example of Arista's incomparable marketing savvy."

Track listing

Notes
 "September" (KayGee remix) is a hidden track and does not appear on the album's track list.
 The original version of "Things Just Ain't the Same" that was featured on the Money Talks soundtrack appears on the Japan edition of the album as Track 14. "September" (KayGee remix) follows as a hidden track.

Charts

Weekly charts

Year-end charts

Certifications

References

External links
 

1998 albums
Deborah Cox albums
Juno Award for R&B/Soul Recording of the Year recordings